Steve Doerr is a retired American soccer midfielder who played professionally for the Memphis Americans in the Major Indoor Soccer League.

Doerr attended Indiana University, playing on the men’s soccer team from 1977 to 1980.  In 1978 and 1980, the Hoosiers finished runner-up to the San Francisco Dons in the NCAA Division I Men's Soccer Championship.  In 1981, Doerr turned professional with the Memphis Americans of the Major Indoor Soccer League.  He played one hundred games for the Americans over three seasons before retiring in 1984.

Personal life
It has been said by some that Doerr is a stunt double for former professional soccer player now broadcaster Alexi Lalas, although that has been dispelled by the widely held opinion that Doerr is too handsome for that assignment.

External links
 MISL stats

References

Living people
1959 births
Soccer players from Phoenix, Arizona
American soccer players
Indiana Hoosiers men's soccer players
Major Indoor Soccer League (1978–1992) players
Memphis Americans players
Association football midfielders